Klemmer is a surname. Notable people with the surname include:

David Klemmer (born 1993), Australian professional rugby league footballer
Grover Klemmer (1921–2015) was an American athlete
John Klemmer (born 1946), American saxophonist, composer, songwriter and arranger
Phil Klemmer, American television writer and producer
Scott Klemmer, American computer scientist